Urraca of Castile (1186/28 May 1187 – 3 November 1220) was a daughter of Alfonso VIII of Castile and Eleanor of England. Her maternal grandparents were Henry II of England and Eleanor of Aquitaine.

Life 
Urraca was originally considered as a prospective bride for Louis VIII of France, but Eleanor of Aquitaine objected to her name (Urraca means magpie in Castilian), preferring the Castilian name of Urraca's sister Blanche, Blanca.

In 1206, Urraca married twenty-one-year-old Afonso II of Portugal, who was the "infante", the intended heir to the throne.

In 1212, her husband became king and she became queen. Afonso II indicated in his will in 1214 that Urraca should be the regent for his heir should he pre-decease her. However, she died before him at a relatively young age in 1220. Urraca was buried at the Alcobaça Monastery.

Issue 
Sancho II of Portugal 
Afonso III of Portugal
Eleanor of Portugal, Queen of Denmark 
Fernando, Lord of Serpa

References

|-

1180s births
1220 deaths
Urraca
Portuguese queens consort
12th-century Spanish women
13th-century Spanish women
12th-century nobility from León and Castile
13th-century Castilians
13th-century Portuguese people
13th-century Portuguese women
Daughters of kings